Spormaggiore (Sporgrànt or Spór in local dialect) is a comune (municipality) in Trentino in the northern Italian region Trentino-Alto Adige/Südtirol, located about  northwest of Trento.

Spormaggiore borders the following municipalities: Tuenno, Ton, Campodenno, Sporminore, Mezzolombardo, Fai della Paganella, Cavedago and Molveno.

Demographic evolution

References

External links
 Homepage of the city

Cities and towns in Trentino-Alto Adige/Südtirol